Landscape with Invisible Hand is a 2023 American science fiction film directed and written by Cory Finley, based on the 2017 novel of the same name by M. T. Anderson. The film stars Tiffany Haddish and Asante Blackk and is set to be released by Metro-Goldwyn-Mayer.

Landscape with Invisible Hand premiered at the Sundance Film Festival on January 23, 2023.

Plot
In a near-future in which an alien species known as the Vuvv has taken over Earth, an aspiring teenage artist and his girlfriend hatch a scheme to make money by broadcasting their dating life to the fascinated aliens in wake of the Vuvv's labor-saving technology. But the two teens slowly come to hate each other and can't break up without bankrupting their families.

Cast
 Tiffany Haddish as Beth Campbell
 Asante Blackk as Adam Campbell
 Brooklynn MacKinzie as Natalie Campbell
 Kylie Rogers as Chloe Marsh 
 John Newberg as Mr. Stanley
 Tony Vogel as Brett
 Josh Hamilton as Mr. Marsh
 Michael Gandolfini as Hunter Marsh
 Christian Adam as Zach
 William Jackson Harper as Mr. Campbell

Production
On November 14, 2017, it was announced that Plan B Entertainment had optioned the rights to a feature film adaptation of M. T. Anderson's recently published novel Landscape with Invisible Hand. Annapurna Pictures was set to co-produce the film under Plan B's three-year overall deal with the company. There were no further developments on the project until December 18, 2020, when it was announced that Plan B Entertainment had signed a second-look film deal with Metro-Goldwyn-Mayer, who was set to produce the film as well as distribute it through the studio's joint venture with United Artists Releasing (which Amazon shut down in 2023 after acquiring MGM). It was also announced that Bad Education filmmaker Cory Finley was attached to adapt the screenplay and direct the film.

On January 4, 2021, Tiffany Haddish was cast in a main role. On June 28, 2021, Asante Blackk was cast in the lead role. Kylie Rogers joined the main cast on September 20, 2021. In February 2022, it was reported that Clifton Collins Jr., Michael Gandolfini, Josh Hamilton and Brooklynn MacKinzie were added to the cast. 

Principal photography began on February 1, 2022, in Atlanta, and wrapped there on March 27, 2022.

Release
The film had its world premiere at the 2023 Sundance Film Festival.  The film will be released theatrically in the United States by Metro-Goldwyn-Mayer.

References

External links
 

Alien invasions in films
American science fiction comedy-drama films
American teen romance films
Annapurna Pictures films
Films about extraterrestrial life
Films about financial crises
Films based on American novels
Films produced by Megan Ellison
Films scored by Michael Abels
Films set in the future
Metro-Goldwyn-Mayer films
Plan B Entertainment films